John Rodney Reay Holmes (24 April 1924 – 3 February 1980) was an English cricketer. Holmes was a right-handed batsman who fielded as a wicket-keeper. He was born at Hollington, Sussex, and educated at Repton School.

After leaving Repton School, Holmes enlisted as a war sub in the war effort with the Rifle Brigade in 1943. In April 1944, he gained the temporary rank of Lieutenant, while following the war he was granted the full rank of 2nd Lieutenant in March 1946, with seniority back to 7 April 1945. In October 1946, Holmes was granted the rank of Lieutenant. Holmes later made his first-class debut for the Free Foresters against Oxford University in 1949. The following season he made his first-class debut for Sussex against Oxford University. The presence of Jim Parks in the Sussex squad limited Holmes to just one further first-class appearance, in 1951 against Oxford University. All three of his first-class appearances came at Oxford University's University Parks. He scored 41 runs in his three innings, which came at an average of 10.25, with a high score of 24. Behind the stumps he took 6 catches and made a single stumping.

In May 1951, Holmes gained the rank of Captain. He retired from service on 16 August 1954, upon which he was granted the honorary rank of Major. He died in an avalanche at Breuil-Cervinia in Italy on 3 February 1980, alongside three other British tourists. His father, Jack, also played first-class cricket for Sussex.

References

External links
John Holmes at ESPNcricinfo
John Holmes at CricketArchive

1924 births
1980 deaths
Sportspeople from Hastings
People educated at Repton School
British Army personnel of World War II
Rifle Brigade officers
English cricketers
Free Foresters cricketers
Sussex cricketers
Deaths in avalanches
Natural disaster deaths in Italy
Wicket-keepers